Ramón Morales Higuera (born 10 October 1975) is a Mexican former professional footballer who played as a midfielder.

Club career 

Morales made his professional debut in the Mexican Primera División in 1995, playing for Rayados de Monterrey in a 0–0 draw match, against Tecos UAG.

He was regarded as one of Mexico's most outstanding and skilful attacking left midfielders, with explosive speed, dribbling skills, fast attacking abilities and a powerful left foot, while also being an outstanding free kick taker. Ramón is known as one of the best mid-range free kick takers in Mexico's Primera División. Morales is a versatile player often playing as a left winger, however it is not uncommon to see him move up in the pitch as a left forward or down on the defensive side as a left-sided wing-back.

Ramón was a key figure for Guadalajara and has been so for years, aiding the team with swift counterattacks, precise crosses and through passes. He was a vital part in Chivas' Championship Apertura 2006 season. On 27 December 2006 Ramón Morales was appointed as Chivas' new captain for the 2007 season following the departure of ex-Chiva Oswaldo Sánchez to Santos Laguna. Morales scored 66 goals for Guadalajara, which is ninth all-time in club history.

His younger brother Carlos, currently plays for Monarcas Morelia and is also a left midfielder.

On 11 August 2011, Morales announced his retirement from professional football after a 16-year career.

Coaching career

On 6 January 2013, Morales was presented as the new coach for Guadalajara Sub-17 Team. On 1 December 2013 he was crowned champions with the Under 17 team in the final against los Tuzos de Pachuca. He was later moved up to be the under-20s coach.

On 3 October 2014, he was appointed as the interim coach of the first division team after the resignation of Carlos Bustos.

In June 2015, after success with the youth teams, he was appointed as the assistant manager of Jose Manuel de la Torre with the first team.

On 14 September 2015, after Jose Manuel de la Torre was released, Morales was appointed as Chivas' interim manager for the second time while a new coach was announced.

International career
Morales made his international debut for the Mexico national team on 12 July 2001, playing against Brazil. Morales played for Mexico at the 2002 FIFA World Cup in Korea-Japan, where he appeared in four matches. He also played in the 2004 Copa América where he scored a freekick goal for Mexico's first official win over Argentina. The game ended 1–0 in favor of Mexico. He also played four games in the 2005 Confederations Cup, in Germany and five games in Mexico's qualification matches for the 2006 World Cup. Morales played in three matches in the 2006 FIFA World Cup. He scored a freekick in Mexico's 2–0 win over Brazil in the first round of the Copa América.

Career statistics

International goals

Honours
Guadalajara
Mexican Primera División: Apertura 2006
InterLiga: 2009

Individual
Mexican Primera División Attacking Midfielder of the Tournament: Clausura 2006

References

External links 
 
 
 
  
 Ramón Morales at FootballDatabase.com

1975 births
Association football midfielders
Living people
C.F. Monterrey players
C.D. Guadalajara footballers
Tecos F.C. footballers
Liga MX players
2002 FIFA World Cup players
2004 Copa América players
2005 FIFA Confederations Cup players
2006 FIFA World Cup players
2007 CONCACAF Gold Cup players
2007 Copa América players
Mexico international footballers
People from La Piedad
Footballers from Michoacán
Mexican footballers